

Petherick is a locality in the Australian state of South Australia located in the state’s south-east about  south-east of the state capital of Adelaide and about  west of the municipal seat in Bordertown.

Its boundaries were created on 24 August 2000 and align with those of the cadastral unit of the Hundred of Petherick from which its name is derived.  The hundred itself was named after Vernon Petherick, a former member of the South Australian Parliament.

The majority land use within Petherick is ’primary production’.  Land in the locality’s north-west corner occupied by the protected area known as the Gum Lagoon Conservation Park includes zonings for both ‘conservation’ and ‘primary production’.

The 2016 Australian census which was conducted in August 2016 reports that Petherick had a population of 33 people.

Petherick is located within the federal division of Barker, the state electoral district of MacKillop and the local government area of the Tatiara District Council.

References

  

Towns in South Australia